Eighth-seed José Luis Clerc claimed the title and first prize money of $28,000 by defeating qualifier Mel Purcell in the final.

Seeds
A champion seed is indicated in bold text while text in italics indicates the round in which that seed was eliminated.

  Gene Mayer (third round)
  Harold Solomon (third round)
  Eddie Dibbs (quarterfinals)
  Ivan Lendl (second round)
  José Higueras (semifinals)
  Wojciech Fibak (quarterfinals)
  Hans Gildemeister (first round)
  José Luis Clerc (champion)
  Victor Amaya (second round)
  Eliot Teltscher (quarterfinals)
  Raúl Ramírez (first round)
  Phil Dent (second round)
  Kim Warwick (third round)
  Hank Pfister (second round)
  Colin Dibley (first round)
  Terry Moor (quarterfinals)

Draw

Finals

Top half

Section 1

Section 2

Bottom half

Section 3

Section 4

References

External links

U.S. Clay Court Championships
1980 U.S. Clay Court Championships